Walden Media, LLC or Walden Media is an American film investor, distributor, and publishing company founded in 2000 by Micheal Flaherty and Cary Granat. Its films are based on children's literature, biographies or historical events, as well as documentaries and some original screenplays.

The corporate headquarters of Walden Media are located in Los Angeles, California. The company is owned by the Christian conservative Philip Anschutz, who has said he expects their movies "to be entertaining, but also to be life affirming and to carry a moral message."

Walden Media operates Walden Pond Press, a joint venture with HarperCollins, which publishes middle grade books.

Company history
Walden Media was founded in 2000 by Micheal Flaherty and Cary Granat as a movie, television, publishing and Internet enterprise whose goal is to teach and entertain kids. Granat was president of Miramax's Dimension Films division, and Flaherty came from the world of education. The two were housemates at Tufts University before following different paths, and later reunited to form the company.

The company's notable releases include Holes in 2003, Because of Winn-Dixie in 2005, Charlotte's Web in 2006, Bridge to Terabithia, in 2007, three adaptations of The Chronicles of Narnia in 2005, 2008 and 2010, Ramona and Beezus in 2010, and both A Dog's Purpose and Wonder in 2017. All of these films are adaptations of popular children's books.

In late 2001, Anschutz Entertainment Group purchased a majority stake in the company, leaving the founders as minority shareholders.

Walden Media signed a marketing partnership with 20th Century Fox in 2006 under the Fox Walden name. Several movies flopped under the partnership, so in October 2008, Fox Walden reduced its staffing.

In March 2008, Michael Bostick, formerly of Imagine Films, was hired as creative officer. Cary Granat was released from his co-CEO title effective December 1, 2008, with Bostick replacing him. Walden Media created a joint publishing venture with HarperCollins during the same year called Walden Pond Press.

Frank Smith was named CEO in 2013 after working with the company for ten years. Prior to joining the Anschutz Film Group, Smith worked at New Line Cinema/Fine Line Features.

Education program
Walden Media is unique among film production and distribution companies in that it works with teachers, museums, and national organizations to develop supplemental educational programs and materials associated with its films and the original events and/or novels that inspire the films.

Walden Media offers in-class teaching tools like educational guides and teacher kits and sponsors seminars and forums for teachers to discuss their practice and to share ideas on using media in the classroom. Directors, writers, and stars of the productions participate in these events.

In 2006, Walden Media sponsored the "Break the World Reading Record with Charlotte's Web". At noon on Wednesday, December 13, 547,826 readers in 2,451 locations, 50 states and 28 countries read an excerpt from Charlotte's Web, breaking the world record of 155,528 students from 737 schools in the United Kingdom who read William Wordsworth's poem, "Daffodils" in 2004.

Filmography

Feature films

Television series

Etymology and logo
The company is named after Walden Pond in Concord, Massachusetts. Its logo is a rock skipping across a pond.

References

External links
 Official website
 FoxWalden website

Film production companies of the United States
Film distributors of the United States
 
American companies established in 2000
Entertainment companies based in California
Companies based in Los Angeles
Entertainment companies established in 2000
2000 establishments in California
Anschutz Corporation